Crossing Over may refer to:

 Chromosomal crossover, a cellular process
 "Crossing Over" a song by Van Halen on the Japanese release of their 1995 album Balance
 Crossing Over, a 1998 album by Hesperus
 Crossing Over with John Edward, a 1999–2004 television show on which self-described psychic John Edward gives readings to audience members
 Crossing Over, a 2001 book by John Edward
 Crossing Over (film), a 2009 film
 "Crossing Over", a song by Five Finger Death Punch from the 2009 album War Is the Answer
 "Crossing Over", a season 4 (2010–2011) episode of Eureka
 "Crossing Over", a song by Lowen & Navarro